The Waiter's Restaurant is an Italian restaurant in Melbourne, Australia, described as a "Melbourne institution". Founded in 1947 as the Italian Waiter's Club, it was initially a place for waiters (mainly of Italian and Spanish heritage) to have a meal, a drink and play cards after their work - in breach of the very strict liquor licensing laws in place at the time. As such it became popular with other late night workers such as reporters and policemen.

The restaurant is located up a "steep flight of stairs [leading to] a plain white door" suggesting "a no-frills massage parlour rather than a no-frills Italian food joint".

In 1978, the restaurant was the venue of a siege when Amos Atkinson, armed with two shotguns, held 30 people hostage and demanded the release of Melbourne underworld figure Mark "Chopper" Read, his criminal associate. After shots were fired the siege was lifted when Atkinson's mother, in her dressing gown, arrived at the restaurant to act as go-between. Atkinson's mother hit him over the head with her handbag and told him to stop being so stupid. Atkinson then surrendered.

References

Further reading

Restaurants in Melbourne
Italian restaurants in Australia
Buildings and structures in Melbourne City Centre